Soliman, Tunisia (Tunsi: Slimène [Slee-men]) is a town and commune in the Nabeul Governorate, Tunisia. As of 2017 it had a population of 57,060.

See also
List of cities in Tunisia

References

Populated places in Tunisia
Communes of Tunisia
Tunisia geography articles needing translation from French Wikipedia